Calovébora is a corregimiento in Santa Fé District, Veraguas Province, Panama with a population of 4,397 as of 2010. Its population as of 1990 was 3,043; its population as of 2000 was 2,342.

References

Corregimientos of Veraguas Province